Vincenzo Landinelli  (died 1627) was a Roman Catholic prelate who served as Bishop of Albenga (1616–1624) and Apostolic Collector to Portugal (1620–1621).

Biography
Vincenzo Landinelli was born in Sarzana, Italy.
On 3 August 1616, he was appointed during the papacy of Pope Paul V as Bishop of Albenga.
On 14 August 1616, he was consecrated bishop by Giambattista Leni, Bishop of Ferrara, with Galeazzo Sanvitale, Archbishop Emeritus of Bari-Canosa, and Ulpiano Volpi, Archbishop Emeritus of Chieti, serving as co-consecrators. 
On 4 June 1620, he was appointed during the papacy of Pope Paul V as Apostolic Collector to Portugal; he resigned on 15 September 1621.
He served as Bishop of Albenga until his resignation in 1624. 
He died on January 1627.

Episcopal succession

References

External links and additional sources
 (for Chronology of Bishops) 
 (for Chronology of Bishops) 
 (for Chronology of Bishops) 

17th-century Italian Roman Catholic bishops
Bishops appointed by Pope Paul V
1624 deaths